Lady of Tikal, also known as Woman of Tikal (1 September 504 – after ), was a queen of the Mayan city of Tikal. She took the throne on 19 April 511 and reigned until about 527.

Biography 
According to the inscription on Stela 23, the Lady of Tikal assumed a leadership role on 19 April 511, at the age of six, but did not rule on her own. Instead, she co-ruled with an individual named Kaloomteʼ Bahlam. She was possibly the daughter of Chak Tok Ichʼaak II. Lady of Tikal was depicted on Stela 23, which was broken and later re-erected incomplete. It is presumed that Stela 6 and Stela 12 also mention Lady of Tikal, but she is referred to by a different name. Her relationship to Bird Claw, who may have been her successor (and the 20th ruler of Tikal), is unknown due to problems deciphering the text of Stela 8, but it is important to note that Bird Claw does not carry the Tikal emblem.

The name "Lady of Tikal" can also refer to Lady Six Sky of Dos Pilas/Naranjo, more commonly known as "Woman of Tikal". The first Lady of Tikal was born in September 504 while Lady Six Sky acceded to the throne at Naranjo in 682.

Notes

Footnotes

References 

Rulers of Tikal
Tikal
6th century in the Maya civilization
6th-century monarchs in North America
6th-century women rulers
504 births
Year of death unknown
Date of death unknown